Kydia calycina is a species of flowering plant in the genus Kydia found in the Indian subcontinent, southern China and Southeast Asia. A fastgrowing, mediumsized tree, it is widely exploited, even cultivated, for cheap timber and fiber.

References

Hibisceae
Plants described in 1811